SS John Walker was a Liberty ship built in the United States during World War II. She was named after John Walker, a representative of the House of Burgesses. He was in the Continental Army, serving in 1777 as an aide-de-camp to General George Washington, holding the rank of colonel. In 1780, he was elected as a delegate to the Continental Congress. He then studied law. When William Grayson died in 1790, Walker was appointed to the United States Senate to serve from March 31 to November 9.

Construction
John Walker was laid down on 1 June 1942, under a Maritime Commission (MARCOM) contract, MCE hull 305, by the Bethlehem-Fairfield Shipyard, Baltimore, Maryland; she was sponsored by Mrs. Arthur J. Williams, the wife of the assistant secretary for MARCOM, and was launched on 22 July 1942.

History
She was allocated to United Fruit Co., on 30 July 1942. On 11 March 1946, she was laid up in the James River Reserve Fleet, Lee Hall, Virginia. On 14 March 1961, she was sold for scrapping to Schiavone Bonomo Corp., for $56,411. She was removed from the fleet on 17 April 1961.

References

Bibliography

 
 
 
 

 

Liberty ships
Ships built in Baltimore
1942 ships
James River Reserve Fleet